Sintești may refer to several villages in Romania:

 Sintești, a village in Borănești Commune, Ialomița County
 Sintești, a village in Vidra Commune, Ilfov County
 Sintești, a village in Margina Commune, Timiș County